Chicken-fried steak, also known as country-fried steak or CFS, is an American breaded cutlet dish consisting of a piece of beefsteak (most often tenderized cube steak) coated with seasoned flour and either deep-fried or pan-fried. It is sometimes associated with the Southern cuisine of the United States. It is breaded and fried with a technique similar to the more common fried chicken, hence "chicken-fried". When deep-fried, it is usually referred to as "chicken-fried steak". Pan-fried versions are typically referred to as "country fried steak".

Chicken-fried steak resembles the Austrian dish Wiener schnitzel and the Italian dish , which is a tenderized veal or pork cutlet, coated with flour, eggs, chicken stock cube, and bread crumbs, and then fried. It is also similar to the recipe for Scottish collops.

History

The precise origins of the dish are unclear, but many sources attribute its development to German and Austrian immigrants to Texas in the 19th century, who brought recipes for Wiener schnitzel from Europe to the USA. Lamesa, the seat of Dawson County on the Texas South Plains, claims to be the birthplace of chicken-fried steak, and hosts an annual celebration accordingly.

The Virginia Housewife, published in 1838 by Mary Randolph, has a recipe for veal cutlets that is one of the earliest recipes for a food like chicken-fried steak. The recipe for what we now know as chicken-fried steak was included in many regional cookbooks by the late 19th century. The Oxford English Dictionary's earliest attestation of the term "chicken-fried steak" is from a restaurant advertisement in the 19 June 1914 edition of the Colorado Springs Gazette newspaper.

A 1943 American cookbook recipe for Wiener schnitzel includes a white salt and pepper cream gravy.

Chicken-fried steak is among numerous popular dishes which make up the official state meal of Oklahoma, added to the list in 1988.

Preparation
Chicken-fried steak is prepared by taking a thin cut of beefsteak and tenderizing it by pounding, cubing, or forking. It is then immersed in egg batter or buttermilk, then dredged in flour to which salt, pepper, and often other seasonings have been added. Chicken-fried steak is typically deep-fried and served with cream gravy, while country fried steak is typically fried in a skillet and served with brown gravy. The frying medium has traditionally been shortening, but butter and lard have sometimes been used instead. Health concerns have led many cooks to replace the shortening with vegetable oil.

When there are problems with the breading separating from the meat while cooking, it can be very useful to first dredge the meat in the flour mixture, then the egg or buttermilk, and then the flour mixture again, and then let it sit for a half-hour or more before cooking.

The cuts of steak used for chicken-fried steak are usually the less expensive, less desirable ones, such as cube steak, chuck, round steak, and occasionally flank steak. The method may be used for chopped or ground beef, but it is not called chicken-fried steak. Chicken-fried steak is usually served for lunch or dinner topped with cream gravy and with mashed potatoes, vegetables, and biscuits or Texas toast served on the side. In the Midwest, it is also common to serve chicken-fried steak for breakfast, along with toast and hash browns.

The steak can be served on a hamburger bun with cream gravy as a "chicken-fried steak sandwich". It can also be cubed and stuffed in a baked potato with gravy and cheese.

Alternatively, the tenderized steak may be cut into strips, breaded, deep-fried, and served for breakfast with eggs and toast or for other meals in a basket with fries and cream gravy. Known as "finger steaks" or "steak fingers", this is a popular dish in the state of Idaho.

Variants

Typically, in Texas and surrounding states, chicken fried steak is either deep fried or fried in a thick layer of oil in a pan and served with traditional peppered milk gravy.

Regionally, when pan-fried it may be referred to as "country fried steak". While some recipes and restaurants will use a traditional peppered milk gravy on country fried steak, a variant using a brown, beef stock-based gravy with onions is common and is the primary difference between the two dishes in regions where both are served.

See also

Chicken fried bacon
City chicken
Cotoletta
List of regional dishes of the United States
Parmo
Parmigiana
Schnitzel
Tonkatsu

References

External links

Country Fried Steak at The Food Timeline
Chicken Fried Steak in Texas Cooking Magazine

Cuisine of the Southern United States
Fried foods
Texan cuisine
Beef steak dishes
Breaded cutlets
American meat dishes